Louisiana Highway 3127 (LA 3127)  is a state highway in Louisiana that serves Ascension, St. James, St. John the Baptist, and St. Charles Parishes.  It spans  in a northwest to southeast direction.  It parallels LA 18 along the west bank of the Mississippi River, providing a much shorter inland bypass of the River Road.  It is bannered in all four cardinal directions depending upon the part of the route.

Route description
Throughout its length, LA 3127 was built to eventually accommodate four lanes of traffic, as the land throughout its routing has been cleared for this accommodation.  From the northwest, LA 3127 begins at a junction with LA 70 east of Donaldsonville and immediately enters St. James Parish.  Undivided, two lanes, and largely secluded for the first several miles, it heads eastward and intersects LA 3219 near the community of St. James.  Near Vacherie, it intersects   LA 20.  Continuing eastward, the route crosses into St. John the Baptist Parish before a junction with LA 640 south of Edgard.  As LA 3127 crosses into St. Charles Parish, the highway turns toward the southeast.  Shortly afterward, it divides and expands to four lanes.  Access to the river communities of Killona, Taft, and Hahnville as well as many chemical and industrial facilities are provided via junctions with LA 3141, LA 3142, and LA 3160, respectively.

The final  of LA 3127 consist of a concurrency with I-310, beginning at Exit 10.  Both highways end at signaled intersection/interchange with US 90 just west of Boutte.  As US 90 is slated to be upgraded to interstate standards (as Interstate 49), there are plans to massively reconfigure both the interchanges.

An extension of LA 3213 (which crosses the Mississippi River via the Veterans Memorial Bridge) to connect with LA 3127 opened in June 2008.  This junction is between LA 20 and LA 640.

Major intersections

References

External links

La DOTD State, District, and Parish Maps
District 02
District 61
District 62
Ascension Parish
St. James Parish
St. John the Baptist Parish
St. Charles Parish

3127
Transportation in Ascension Parish, Louisiana
Transportation in St. James Parish, Louisiana
Transportation in St. John the Baptist Parish, Louisiana
Transportation in St. Charles Parish, Louisiana